Major John Bolling (January 27, 1676April 20, 1729) was an American planter, politician and military officer in the colony of Virginia. He was the great-grandchild of Pocahontas and her husband, John Rolfe.

Early life and marriage 

John Bolling was the son of Colonel Robert Bolling and Jane (née Rolfe) Bolling. He was a great-grand-child of Pocahontas and her husband, John Rolfe.

John Bolling was born at Kippax Plantation, in Charles City County, in the east central part of Virginia, a site which is now within the corporate limits of the City of Hopewell. He made his home at the Bolling family plantation "Cobbs" just west of Point of Rocks on the north shore of the Appomattox River downstream from present-day Petersburg, Virginia. (Cobbs was located in Henrico County until the area south of the James River was subdivided to form Chesterfield County in 1749.)

John Bolling married Mary Kennon (–1727), daughter of Richard Kennon and Elizabeth Worsham, on December 29, 1697. They had six children, whose names appear in John Bolling's will: 
 John Bolling Jr. (1700–1757) married Elizabeth Lewis in 1720. Later he married Elizabeth Blair (daughter of Archibald Blair and the niece of James Blair, the first president of the College of William & Mary, whose second husband was Richard Bland) on August 1, 1728 and had at least nine children, including John Bolling III, who married Mary Jefferson (the sister of United States President Thomas Jefferson. ). His Great-great-granddaughter is Edith Bolling, the future First Lady for her husband, Woodrow Wilson.
 Jane Bolling (1703–1766) married Colonel Richard Randolph in 1724 and had seven children.
 Elizabeth Bolling (b. 1709), married William Gay of Scotland and had three children.
 Mary Bolling (1711–1744), married John Fleming and had eight children.
 Martha Bolling (1713–1737), married Thomas Eldridge in 1729 and had four children.
 Anne Bolling (1718–1800), married James Murray and had six children.

Later life and death 
In 1722, he opened a tobacco warehouse in what is now the 'Pocahontas' neighborhood of Petersburg. William Byrd II of Westover Plantation is said to have remarked that Major Bolling enjoyed "all the profits of an immense trade with his countrymen, and of one still greater with the Indian."

Major Bolling served in the Virginia House of Burgesses from 1710 until his death in 1729.

References

External links

1676 births
1729 deaths
Rolfe family of Virginia
Bolling family of Virginia
American planters
American slave owners
American people of English descent
People from Charles City County, Virginia
House of Burgesses members
American people of Powhatan descent